Q-School 2015 – Event 2 was the second of two qualifying tournaments for the 2015/16 snooker season that took place from 20 to 25 May 2015 at Meadowside Centre in Burton-upon-Trent, England.

The four qualifying spots were won by Jason Weston, Gareth Allen, Duane Jones and Paul Davison who beat Kuldesh Johal, Alex Taubman, Zhao Xintong and Luke Simmonds respectively in the finals of their draw. Jason Weston and Paul Davison being the only winners to have previously held a tour card.

Format
The tournament consisted of 166 participants from 22 different nations who were randomly assigned to four sections at the start of the tournament. Each section plays in the knockout system with the winner of each section earning a two-year tour card to play on the main tour for the  2015/16 snooker season and 2016/17 snooker season. All matches will be the best-of-7.

Players in the tournament consist of former professionals trying to regain their tour cards and amateurs attempting to join the main tour for the first time. Former professionals in the tournament include former world number 17 Andy Hicks as well as Alex Davies, Alexander Ursenbacher, Leo Fernandez, Ahmed Saif, Elliot Slessor, Paul Davison, Sam Craigie, Jamie O'Neill, Kacper Filipiak, Adam Duffy, Marcus Campbell, Chen Zhe, Chris Norbury, Hammad Miah and former 10-time Women's snooker champion Reanne Evans who was attempting to regain a place on the main tour for the first time since 2011. Evans and Heather Clare were the only female competitors in the tournament.

Following their victories in Q-School Event 1, Sydney Wilson, Daniel Wells, Eden Sharav and Rhys Clark all withdrew from the competition.

Main draw

Round 1

Best of 7 frames

Section 1

Section 2

Section 3

Section 4

References

Snooker competitions in England
Q School (snooker)
2015 in snooker
2015 in English sport
Sport in Burton upon Trent